Pankaj Kumar Rajak (born 30 March 1999) is an Indian field hockey player who plays as a goalkeeper. He was a member of the Indian national team that won the silver medal at the 2016 South Asian Games.

Biography 
Rajak hails from Hurhuru-Patratu, a village in the Hazaribagh district of India's State of Jharkhand (then a part of Bihar). His father Dadan Prasad Rajas is a washerman. Pankaj Kumar is the youngest among four siblings.

Career 
Rajak enrolled in the Hazaribagh Day Boarding Centre in 2009 and was suggested to take up goalkeeping by his first coach Koleshwar Gope. Rajak trained there till 2012 before moving to Sports Authority of India, Ranchi where he stayed till 2014. He was a part of the Jharkhand squad in 2013 and 2014 for the sub-junior national championships. He subsequently moved to SAIL Hockey Academy in Rourkela, where he was picked for the under-21 national team that competed at the Volve Hockey Open Cup the following year in England. Rajak then played at the 2016 South Asian Games and won silver with the under-21 team that India fielded for the Games. He also featured in the squads that won gold at the Under-18 Asia Cup and bronze at the Under-21 Sultan of Johor Cup during this time. In the club level, he plays for his employer Indian Oil.

In May 2022, Rajak was named in the 20-member squad for the Asia Cup.

References 

1999 births
Living people
Indian male field hockey players
Field hockey players from Jharkhand
Male field hockey goalkeepers
South Asian Games silver medalists for India
South Asian Games medalists in field hockey